The M63 ground mount is a four-legged anti-aircraft weapon mount used on the M2HB Browning machine gun.

The tripod itself weighs 65 kg (144 lb) and has a height of 106.7 cm (42 in) with M2. It has a maximum elevation of 85°, depression of 29° and traverse of 360°.

The mount is usually sandbagged in a hole with each leg staked down. Use against ground targets is better suited to the M3 tripod because the mount tends to be unstable when the gun is fired at low angles.

References

See also
M205 tripod
M3 tripod
M2 tripod
M122 tripod
M192 Lightweight Ground Mount

Firearm components
United States Marine Corps equipment